Lake DeFuniak is an almost perfectly circular 40 acre lake in DeFuniak Springs, Florida, United States, at the center of the DeFuniak Springs Historic District.

Lake DeFuniak is one of the two almost perfectly round circular spring-fed lakes in the world, the other being Kingsley Lake.

References

External links

http://www.defuniaksprings.net/index.aspx?NID=890

DeFuniak
DeFuniak